Harshita Shekhar Gaur (born 12 October 1992) is an Indian actress known for her work on the youth-based show Sadda Haq, in which she played the lead role of Sanyukta Agarwal and Dimpy Pandit in the 2018 web series Mirzapur.

Early life and career 
Harshita Gaur was born in New Delhi to a family of doctors. She completed her studies in engineering at Amity University, Noida, where she also participated in drama and creative societies. She started her career as a model, and while she was still pursuing her engineering studies, she got an offer from Sadda Haq, which marked her television debut. She managed to act while finishing her studies.

Gaur is also a trained Kathak dancer and has performed in stage shows across India. She has also performed in many commercials, including Dabur Vatika hair oil, Garnier light cream, and Sunsilk. Her latest commercial ad is for Renault Kwid. In 2018, she was hired for the role of 'Dimpy Pandit' in the Amazon Prime web series Mirzapur and was highly praised for her performance. She is seen again in the second season of Mirzapur.

Filmography

Films

Television

Web series

Music videos

References

External links

 
 

1992 births
Living people
Indian film actresses
Indian television actresses
Indian soap opera actresses
Indian women television presenters
Actresses in Hindi television
21st-century Indian actresses